Seppä is a Finnish surname meaning "smith". Notable people with the surname include:

Jyrki Seppä (born 1961), ice hockey player
Pirjo Seppä (born 1946), orienteer

See also
Sepp, an Estonian surname with the same meaning (smith)

Finnish-language surnames